The 2021 Southeast Asian Games, officially known as the 31st Southeast Asian Games, 31st SEA Games or SEA Games 31, and also recognized as Hanoi 2021, was the 31st edition of the Southeast Asian Games, the biennial regional multi-sport event which was held in Hanoi, Vietnam and its surrounding cities from 12 to 23 May 2022.

Originally planned to take place from 21 November to 2 December 2021, it was eventually rescheduled as a result of the COVID-19 pandemic in Vietnam. Featuring 526 events in 40 different sports, the edition follows the sports played in the Olympics, massively rolling back events from the previous edition. This was the second time that Vietnam had hosted the games, having previously done so for the 2003 edition. The country had previously submitted a bid to host the 2018 Asian Games and won, but later withdrew due to financial restraints.

The host country Vietnam emerged in the medal tally as the overall champions for the first time in 19 years, recording 205 gold medals (the most by any country thus far) along with 125 silvers and 106 bronzes, accumulating 446 medals in total. They were followed by Thailand and Indonesia, with the Philippines and Singapore rounding out the top five.

Host selection
Hanoi and Ho Chi Minh City both submitted bids to host the games. While Ho Chi Minh City was initially favoured, Hanoi is later deemed to be the more suitable location due to its existing sporting infrastructure. This came after the Vietnamese Prime Minister Nguyễn Tấn Dũng ordered provinces and cities to not build new sporting facilities as a cost-saving measure, following the country's withdrawal from hosting the 2018 Asian Games due to financial restraints.

Hanoi
According to Hanoi's submitted proposal to the Ministry of Culture, Sports and Tourism (MCST), the city would spend 1.7 trillion VND ($77 million) on preparing and organizing the 2-week games running from late November to December. 97 billion VND ($4.3 million) is expected to be earned back from broadcast rights, advertisements, sponsors and other contributions.

Ho Chi Minh City
In December 2017, Ho Chi Minh City Municipal Standing Committee of the Communist Party approved of the city's hosting proposal. According to the proposal, the direct cost for hosting the Games in the city is estimated to be 7.48 trillion VND ($330 million) with 6.6 trillion VND (US$290 million) to be spent on upgrading sports facilities and 904 billion VND ($40 million) on organizing costs. However, another 8.2 trillion VND ($360 million) is needed for the construction of Rach Chiec Sports Complex while an athletes' village will not be built. The Games would run for 12 days in mid-August and see 30-36 sports being contested. The provinces of Đồng Nai and Bình Dương would also host a portion of Games.

Decision
On 9 July 2018, the Vietnamese government selected Hanoi as the host city of the 31st SEA Games and the 2021 ASEAN Para Games, which was later ratified by Vietnamese Prime Minister Nguyễn Xuân Phúc on 13 November 2019.

Postponement
Despite the postponement of the 2020 Summer Olympics in July 2021, the games were still planned to be held from late November to early December 2021, three months after the rescheduled Olympics. The 11th ASEAN Para Games were also to be held from 17 to 23 December 2021. Vietnam Television (VTV) and Voice of Vietnam (VOV) were appointed as the host broadcasters. Originally scheduled to be held from 21 November to 2 December 2021, the games were later postponed to 12 to 23 May 2022 due to the COVID-19 pandemic in Vietnam.

Preparation
Vietnam's SEA Games Organizing Committee (SEAGOC) was formed in April 2020 with the function of preparing, submitting and executing plans to stage the Games.

Budget
The proposed budget allocated by the Vietnamese government for this edition of SEA Games was initially estimated to be 1.6 trillion VND (US$69.3 million). 980.3 billion VND (US$42.3 million) would be used for organizing costs while 602.3 billion VND (US$25.9 million) would be allocated for upgrades and repairs to facilities managed by MCST. Provincial authorities are responsible for renovations to facilities under their management. Other than a new cycling track in Hòa Bình Province and a small tennis complex on Hanoi Sports Training and Competition Centre campus (handled by Hanoi People's Committee), no other sporting venue would be constructed for this edition.

The organization revenue was expected to be 226.6 billion VND (US$9.7 million), with 136.6 billion VND coming from the delegates' accommodation fees and 65 billion VND from broadcast rights.

Due to the COVID-19 pandemic, Vietnam's budget for the Games was cut. In January 2022, the Vietnamese government approved an organizing budget of 750 billion VND (US$32.8 million) for the Games. On April 1, 2022, the Vietnamese government approved an additional budget of 449 billion VND (US$19.65 million) for the Games. The money was taken from the national budget for sports and physical training in 2022. Four ministries and central agencies were provided 378.3 billion VND, while Hanoi and 11 other provinces received an additional 70.7 billion VND.

Venues

While Hanoi was the main hub, several other surrounding provinces assisted in hosting portions of the games. Athletes and officials were housed in hotels near their competition venues. In the initial plan, a new tennis complex was planned to be built on Hanoi Sports Training and Competition Centre campus and a newly rebuilt Hàng Đẫy Stadium would host a group for men's football. Both of these projects faced development delays and difficulties and could no longer be completed in time for the games. Consequently, the tennis venue was relocated to a newly-built private venue in Bắc Ninh Province, and Việt Trì Stadium hosted a men's football group alongside Thiên Trường Stadium during the group stage.

Non-competition venues

Volunteers
The organizing committee planned to recruit around 3,000 volunteers for the Games with 2,000 of them based in Hanoi. In February 2022, SEAGOC started to work with local Hanoi colleges, mainly Hanoi University and Hanoi Open University to start the process. Applicants were required to be fully vaccinated against COVID-19. Selected volunteers would receive orientation and training between March and April before being assigned to specific venues in April 2022.

Torch relay
The torch relay was held 31 days prior to the opening ceremony, representing 31 editions of the Southeast Asian Games. The relay began at Hùng Temple in Phú Thọ Province on 11 April 2022, and went through all hosting provinces before arriving at the cauldron at Mỹ Đình National Stadium in Hanoi on 12 May.

Ticketing
The SEAGOC encouraged each provincial organizing committee to allow spectators to enter competition venues for free. However, the decision to release and/or charge for tickets is ultimately dependent on each province. Hải Phòng and Quảng Ninh expressed interests in free entry for all spectators, with the latter being the largest cluster of venues outside of Hanoi. Meanwhile, Phú Thọ, the host for all of Vietnam's matches in men's football, has planned on selling tickets.

The Games

COVID-19 regulations
Due to the COVID-19 pandemic, all athletes and officials entering Vietnam were required to have a negative PCR-based COVID-19 test within 72 hours of their departure. Within 24 hours of entry and of their respective event, participants would be tested again using rapid testing.

If an athlete tests positive for COVID-19, they would be quarantined at their designated facility, or transported to a hospital in severe cases. For a positive case tested before their respective event, the NOC could replace the athlete with another one. However, if a positive case turns up while the event is still ongoing, the athlete can no longer participate and their results would be invalidated.

Spectators did not have to show any negative test result to enter. However, the amount of spectators allowed at a venue depended on the local COVID-19 regulations at the time of competition.

Opening ceremony
The opening ceremony for the Games was held on 12 May 2022 - 20:00 (local time) at the Mỹ Đình National Stadium. Merited artist, Vietnamese choreographer and head of the Vietnamese Department of Performing Arts Trần Ly Ly was the chief director of the ceremony, with record producer Huy Tuấn serving as a music director. Only 31 athletes from each country participated in the parade of nations, as a preventive measure against COVID-19.

3D mapping, virtual reality, augmented reality, extended reality and mixed reality were among the technologies used during the ceremony. More than 1,000 actors were mobilized for the performance, with each smaller performance featured more than 200 actors and actresses. The stage is designed with 44 projectors for demonstrating projection mapping technology and the stadium pitch was turned into a display surface. In addition, the entirety of stand B in the stadium was used as the main stage.

The ceremony, titled "Welcoming Southeast Asia", featured three main performances which included: Friendly Vietnam, Strong Southeast Asia, and Shining Southeast Asia. The stories of bamboo and wet rice culture, which represent the flexibility and resistance of the Vietnamese people and the lotus as the national flower, were among the elements featured in the ceremony.

The first performance, “Friendly Vietnam”, shows the message that Vietnam is a country with a culture with its own identity and friendly with people from all countries of the world. The second performance, “Strong Southeast Asia”, demonstrates the strength of the ASEAN community. The third performance, “Shining Southeast Asia”, shows the strength of solidarity and friendship between Vietnam and ASEAN countries.

Welcome, national flag and anthem 
The ceremony began with the introduction of several dignitaries including Vietnamese President Nguyễn Xuân Phúc, President of the National Assembly Vương Đình Huệ, Deputy Prime Minister Vũ Đức Đam and Speaker of the Parliament of Singapore Tan Chuan Jin to the audiences. Eight People's Army of Vietnam personnel carried the Vietnamese flag to the flagpole while performing the goose step and raised it to the Vietnamese national anthem – "Tiến Quân Ca". At the end of the anthem, a superimposed Vietnamese flag was shown flying across the television screen.

Parade of Nations 
Each delegation was led by a woman wearing a red Áo dài printed with floral pattern carrying an oval-shaped placard that bore the name of the delegation.

Closing ceremony
The closing ceremony for the Games was held on 23 May 2022 at 20:00 (local time) at the Hanoi Indoor Games Gymnasium. The ceremony, bearing the theme "Coming Together to Shine", featured three main performances which included: ‘My Hanoi, Your Love’, ‘Gathering’ and ‘Shining’ to mark the rejuvenation of sports in Southeast Asia after being halted since March 2020 due to the COVID-19 pandemic. Athletes Nguyen Thi Oanh and Nguyen Huy Hoang (Vietnam), Josh Atkinson (Thailand), and Quah Jing Wen (Singapore) were awarded the “Best Athletes Award” during the ceremony to commend their achievements during the games, breaking Southeast Asian Games records. The flag of the Southeast Asian Games Federation was eventually lowered and handed over to Cambodia, the host country of the 2023 edition.

Participating nations
All 11 members of Southeast Asian Games Federation took part in the 2021 SEA Games. Below is a list of all the participating NOCs.

While Thailand and Indonesia were initially barred from using their national flags due to sanctions by the World Anti-Doping Agency, the sanction was lifted on 3 February 2022.

 
 
 
 
 
 
 
 
 
 
  (Host)

Sports

The 31st SEA Games featured 40 sports with 522 events. 16 out of 40 sports are those not included in the Olympic Games at the time the 31st SEA Games were held.

8 out of 40 sports were not included in both the Olympic Games and Asian Games at the time the 31st SEA Games were held: Bodybuilding, Chess, Dancesport, Kickboxing, Muay, Pencak silat, Pétanque and Vovinam. According to the SEAGF Charter and Rules, a host nation must stage a minimum of 22 sports: the two compulsory sports from Category I (athletics and aquatics), in addition to a minimum of 14 sports from Category II (Olympics and Asian Games mandatory sports), and a maximum of 8 sports from Category III.

† indicates non-Olympics sports and disciplines

Calendar

Medal table

Notable occurrences 

 A total of 1760 medals, comprising 525 gold medals, 522 silver medals and 713 bronze medals were awarded to athletes.
 The host country Vietnam's performance was their best to date and also the best of any country at any games, beating Indonesia's 194-gold finish in 1997, and they also placed first overall and won the entire games.
 The Philippines got their best finish in the games that they are not hosting since their 57-gold finish in 1993.
 Brunei got their worst medal count in the games since 1985.
 Malaysia got their worst finish in the games since 1983 where they also placed 6th.
 Cambodia finished the games with 9-gold medals their best since 1973 when they were represented as the Khmer Republic.
 Laos got their best finish in the games since 2013.
 Vietnam was the best nation in athletics, keeping their streak for 3 editions.
 The Philippines lost the gold-medal game in Basketball, losing their gold-streak that was started in 1991.
 Vietnam won the women's football tournament, keeping their streak for 3 editions.

Marketing

Official branding
On 30 August 2019, Vietnam Olympic Committee launched a nationwide contest to find the official logo, mascot, slogan, and song for both 31st SEA Games and 2021 ASEAN Para Games. The contest ran until 30 October 2019. The top 3 in each category were intended to be featured on a ballot and Vietnamese nationals could then vote for the winning creation. On 20 October 2019, a mascot named after the canine character Vàng in Nam Cao's famous short story Lão Hạc was awarded People's Choice Award by the organizer. On 26 October 2019, the final top 3 mascots, selected by an internal panel, were announced. These mascots took inspirations from various Vietnamese animals: the endangered species saola, the mythical creature "con nghê", and tigers. The selected designs were met with a negative reception by the Vietnamese public. The organizers later withdrew the announcement, stating that the designs were preliminary and would undergo further adjustments. The reveal was then postponed to November 2019, and later indefinitely postponed.

On 19 November 2020, the winning entries were announced. No theme song was selected from the contest, with the organizing committee commissioning composer Quang Vinh, who previously penned the theme song "For the World of Tomorrow" for the 22nd SEA Games in 2003, to write a new theme song for this edition.

Logo
The 31st SEA Games logo was designed by Hoàng Xuân Hiếu. Hiếu's logo is inspired by the combined images of a dove and a human hand to create the "V" shape, representing the words "victory" and "Vietnam". This idea originates from the image of an athlete placing his hand on his left chest, singing the National Anthem before each sacred match.  In addition, the bird's wings are a symbol of extraordinary will, desire to conquer and great sportsmanship.

Mascot

The mascot of the 2021 Southeast Asian Games is Sao La, inspired by the saola – a rare mammal native to central Vietnam. This design by Ngô Xuân Khôi defeated 557 other mascot submissions to emerge as the winner of the 2019 search contest.

Slogan
"For a Stronger Southeast Asia" was chosen as the slogan of this edition. The slogan represents Vietnam's hope as ASEAN Chair 2020, for the region to develop further, and signifies the region's strive to tackle the COVID-19 pandemic.

Theme song
During the International Press Conference held on 28 February 2022, "Let's Shine", the official theme song of the 31st SEA Games, was revealed. The song was composed by Huy Tuấn and performed by Tùng Dương, Hồ Ngọc Hà, Văn Mai Hương, Isaac and Đen Vâu, and features lyrics in English and Vietnamese.

Sponsors
There were four tiers of sponsorships for the 31st SEA Games. Diamond sponsors contributed more than 10 billion VND (US$438,000) in cash or 13 billion VND (US$569,000) worth of products or services. Platinum sponsors contributed 5-10 billion VND in cash or 8-13 billion VND worth of products or services. Gold sponsors contributed 3-5 billion VND in cash or 6-8 billion VND worth of products or services. Partnering sponsors contributed under 3 billion VND in cash, or under 6 billion VND worth of products or services. Vietcontent was the main sponsorship agency of the Games.

Broadcasting rights

Notes

References

External links
 
 

 
Southeast Asian Games by year
Southeast Asian Games
Southeast Asian Games
S
S
Southeast Asian Games, 2021
2022 in Asian sport
Sport in Hanoi
21st century in Hanoi
Southeast Asian Games